Vasily Akimovich Kharlamov (January 1, 1875 – March 13, 1957) was a Russian politician involved in the revolution and civil war.

Kharlamov, of the Don Cossacks, was a member of the Constitutional Democratic Party and was elected to all four State Dumas of the Russian Empire. After the 1917 February Revolution, the Russian Provisional Government made him a chair of the ephemeral Special Transcaucasian Committee (Ozakom) in 1917. Later, Kharlamov headed the Government of the Union of South-Eastern Cossack troops, Caucasus Mountaineers and Free Peoples of the Steppe. During the Russian Civil War, he emerged as one of the leaders of the Don White movement.

After the Bolshevik victory in the war, Kharlamov fled abroad. He died in Buenos Aires, Argentina, leaving a memoirs of the civil war years.

References 

1875 births
1957 deaths
People from Don Host Oblast
Don Cossacks
Russian Constitutional Democratic Party members
Members of the 1st State Duma of the Russian Empire
Members of the 2nd State Duma of the Russian Empire
Members of the 3rd State Duma of the Russian Empire
Members of the 4th State Duma of the Russian Empire
Russian Constituent Assembly members
White movement people
White Russian emigrants to Bulgaria
White Russian emigrants to Czechoslovakia
White Russian emigrants to Argentina
Argentine people of Russian descent